The Brisbane Heat are an Australian men's professional Twenty20 franchise cricket team that competes in the Big Bash League. The Heat wears a teal uniform and are based in Brisbane in the Australian state Queensland. Their home ground is the Brisbane Cricket Ground, also known as The Gabba.
Brisbane Heat need to work on their catches, with a disastrous drop that lost them the title. #CatchesWinMatches

In their second season, they won the Big Bash League for the first time and so qualified for the Champions League Twenty20.

Squad
The current squad of the Brisbane Heat for the 2022–23 Big Bash League season as of 6 December 2022.
 Players with international caps are listed in bold.

Administration and support staff

Captains list

Big Bash League 2011/12
After losing their first four matches of the season, the Heat finished strong, winning their final three games. They finished in 5th place, one place below semi-final qualification. James Hopes was supposed to captain the team, but missed the whole tournament due to injury. Peter Forrest led the team instead. Brendon McCullum missed some matches while playing in the HRV Cup in New Zealand simultaneously. Fellow New Zealander Daniel Vettori missed a few games because of injury.

Big Bash League 2012/13

Heat won four matches and lost four matches in the league stage, sneaking into the semi-finals thanks to net run-rate. In the semi-final the Heat met the Renegades, who finished the league in first place. Luke Pomersbach scored 112* to help the Heat upset the Renegades.

Final
Brisbane Heat defeated the Perth Scorchers in the 2012/13 Big Bash League final.  The match was played at the WACA Ground on 19 January 2013.

Captain James Hopes was unable to play due to injury, so Chris Hartley led the team instead and won the toss, choosing to bat first. Joe Burns top scored for Brisbane with 43 runs off 27 balls, in a total of 167. Jason Behrendorff took 2 wickets for the Scorchers.

In reply, Perth Scorchers scored 133 for the loss of nine wickets from their 20 overs, losing by 34 runs. Adam Voges was the highest scorer with 49 runs from 32 deliveries. Barbadian Kemar Roach took 3 wickets for 18 runs. Nathan Hauritz was named man of the match after bowling three overs for 11 runs and taking three catches.

Big Bash League 2013/14

The team started well, winning their first game against the Perth Scorchers, but then lost the next three games. However, the Heat finished well, winning two of their last three games. They lost the Do-or-die match against Hobart Hurricanes by 40 runs, so giving the Hurricanes the last qualifying spot, leaving the Heat to finish in 5th place. There were good signs for the Heat as Cameron Gannon was the leading wicket taker in the Big Bash, snaring 18 wickets at an average of less than 12 – with best bowling of 4–10. Daniel Vettori was economical with the ball, going for just above six an over and picking up 7 wickets. Chris Lynn was the Heat's highest run scorer, with 198 runs in the season, closely followed by Dan Christian who made 186 runs at an average of 46.5.

Big Bash League 2014/15 
Brisbane Heat lost their first match against Thunder, but bounced back to defeat the Melbourne Stars by one run in a thrilling contest. The Heat then lost five consecutive games, but beat the Hurricanes by 18 runs in their final match of the season. Brisbane Heat finished in last place, winning only two of eight games. Consequently, Stuart Law resigned as coach and James Hopes as captain. Brisbane Heat won the wooden spoon off the Sydney Thunder, who finished last in each of the first 3 seasons of the BBL.

Big Bash League 2015/16 
After retiring from playing, Daniel Vettori signed a 3-year contract to be coach of the franchise. Chris Lynn became the captain for the tournament following the resignation of James Hopes. The Heat signed Josh Lalor, Andrew Fekete (cricketer), Alex Doolan, as well as snapping up West Indian pair Samuel Badree and Lendl Simmons. Rookies Jack Wildermuth and Mitchell Swepson also joined the Heat. They lost their first four matches, before beating the Thunder. The Heat then lost to Strikers, but finished well, beating the Sixers and Stars in their last two matches. The Heat finished 6th in the table with 3 wins and 5 losses. Captain Chris Lynn was tournament's leading run-scorer and was also named Player of the Tournament. He smashed 378 runs in 8 matches, including a century against Hobart Hurricanes in a losing cause.

Big Bash League 2016/17 
Following Brendon McCullum's international retirement, he returned to the Heat to captain the side. He took no part in the previous season due to BBL coinciding with the final matches of his international career. James Hopes retired from cricket. Heat signed local player Marnus Labuschagne and  Alex Ross from Adelaide Strikers. English fast bowler Tymal Mills joined as an international player. The Heat started well, winning their first three matches, but then lost to the Sixers by 3 wickets. The Heat won 2 of their next 3 matches. They lost their last game of the seasons to the Renegades in a thrilling 1 run loss. The Heat finished 2nd in the table with 5 wins and 3 losses. This was their best performance in the league stage. In a thrilling semi-final, they lost to the Sydney Sixers in a super over. Chris Lynn was again named  Player of the Tournament, after scoring 305 runs in 6 matches at an average of 154.5.

Big Bash League 2017-18 
The Heat signed Test opener Matt Renshaw. Pakistani leg break bowler Shadab Khan was signed before the season as an international player, and Yasir Shah was later signed as his replacement. The Heat started off well by defeating Melbourne Stars, but lost to Renegades in next match. They won one of their next two matches and then beat the Stars and Scorchers. However, the Brisbane Heat lost their four remaining matches including a Do-or-die last match against the Renegades, so ending their season.

Big Bash League 2018-19 

The Heat signed Australian fast bowler James Pattinson and Afghan off-spinner Mujeeb Ur Rahman. Youth signings included Max Bryant and Jack Prestwidge. The Heat faced Adelaide Strikers in their first game of the season and lost by 6 wickets. They lost their next two matches against Hurricanes and Sixers, but then beat the Scorchers and the Thunder. The next two matches were against the Renegades, the Heat lost the first but won the second. The next match against the Thunder was abandoned after a power cut. Heat lost their next three matches, but won their last three matches. The Heat finished fifth in standings with 6 wins and 7 losses with one match abandoned. After the season, Brendon McCullum announced his retirement from the BBL.

Big Bash League 2019-20 

Before the season started Brendon McCullum retired and Daniel Vettori resigned as coach. Darren Lehmann re-joined the team as the Head Coach. In BBL|02, he guided the Heat to their maiden BBL Title. The Heat signed AB de Villiers, as well as Afghan left-arm wrist spinner Zahir Khan and young English opener Tom Banton. In the season opener, the Heat lost to the Thunder by 29 runs and then lost the next match to the Stars by 22 runs. In the third match of the season, the Heat beat the Sixers by 48 runs, with Chris Lynn smashing 94 off 35 deliveries, including 11 sixes. They then lost to the Scorchers by 40 runs. They won their next three matches, including a match against the Thunder where Banton hit Arjun Nair for five consecutive sixes.

After losing to the Scorchers by 34 runs, the Heat won their next match against the Strikers by 6 wickets, where AB de Villiers made his Big Bash debut. The ghosts of BBL|07 returned, as the Heat lost their next three matches. In the second of these defeats, the Heat collapsed against the Renegades, losing 10 wickets for 36 runs in 55 balls. A 71 run victory over the Stars, meant the Heat could qualify for the playoffs by beating the Renegades in their last match. However, they lost by 7 wickets with Jack Prestwidge dropping some important opportunities, and so were eliminated.

Big Bash League 2020-21 (BBL|10) 
Before the season, Jack Wildermuth re-joined Heat and Tom Cooper was signed by the Heat. Morné Morkel joined the club as a local player after gaining permanent residency in Australia. Overseas signings included Lewis Gregory and Dan Lawrence. Local Signings included James Bazley, former Rookie player in BBL|04, who joined Heat after 6 seasons, this time having full contract. Ben Cutting, Matt Renshaw, James Pattinson, Josh Lalor and Jack Prestwidge left the club. Tom Banton left due to bio-bubble fatigue and was later replaced by Joe Denly.

Big Bash League 2021-22 
Brisbane Heat finished 7th and missed the finals for the fourth time in five years. The side was heavily hit by COVID and was forced to field a team almost completely devoid of its squad.

Honours

Domestic
Big Bash:
Champions (1): 2012–13
Runners-Up (1): 2022–23
Minor Premiers (0):
Finals Series Appearances (4): 2012–13, 2016–17, 2020–21, 2022–23
Wooden Spoons (1): 2014–15

International
Champions League Twenty20:
Champions (0): 
Runners-Up (0):
Appearances (1): 2013

Records

Team Records

Result summary v. Opponent

Imported players

+= Did not play a game that season

Sponsors

See also

Big Bash League
Queensland Cricket
Queensland cricket team

References

External links

Big Bash League teams
Cricket in Queensland
Sporting clubs in Brisbane
Cricket clubs established in 2011
2011 establishments in Australia